"Bullet Train" is the ninth track and second single by English heavy metal band Judas Priest, from their 1997 album Jugulator. The song remains one of the most popular tracks with Tim "Ripper" Owens on vocals and is featured on their live album '98 Live Meltdown. The single release of the song features a re-recording of the classic track "Rapid Fire" which originally was included on the album British Steel. The second B-side is a re-recorded cover of The Green Manalishi which is a Fleetwood Mac song that the band recorded in 1978. A digipak promo version from 1997 has only the first track. Another promo has "Bullet Train" and "Blood Stained".

Grammy nomination
In 1999, the song was nominated for a Grammy Award for Best Metal Performance but lost to Metallica with their song "Better than You". It was the second time the band was nominated in the category with the first time being in 1990 for the Painkiller album but that time they also lost to Metallica. Later in 2010, the band was nominated and won the Grammy Award for a live performance of "Dissident Aggressor" from the album A Touch of Evil: Live.

Track listing

Personnel
Tim "Ripper" Owens – vocals
K. K. Downing – guitars
Glenn Tipton – guitars
Ian Hill – bass
Scott Travis – drums

References

1997 songs
1998 singles
Judas Priest songs
Songs written by Glenn Tipton
Songs written by K. K. Downing